Direct Blue 1 is an organic compound that is one of many azo dyes.  This salt is used as a substantive dye for textiles with high contents of cellulose, i.e. cotton.  It is prepared by the azo coupling of the aminonaphthalene and diazotized derivative of o-dianisidine.

References

Azo dyes
Naphthalenes
Phenol ethers
Sulfonates
Organic sodium salts